Frank H. Farley is a humanistic psychologist and a past president of the American Psychological Association (APA) and the American Educational Research Association (AERA). He teaches at Temple University and has been a fellow or a leader of several scholarly societies. He has published research on a wide range of topics, from risk-taking personalities to men who visit massage parlors.

Career
Farley was born in Edmonton, Alberta. He says that when he was eight years old, he tried to assist an elderly neighbor who was having a heart attack. Some of his friends froze in the moment. The man died, but the experience later sparked a scientific interest in the psychology of heroic actions. He earned an undergraduate degree and a master's degree from the University of Saskatchewan and a PhD from the University of London. Between 1966 and 1995, Farley taught at the University of Wisconsin–Madison. He is the Laura H. Carnell Professor of Educational Psychology at Temple University.

Farley was the president of the AERA in 1980–1981. He was on the board of directors for the International Society for the Study of Individual Differences (ISSID) between 1983 and 1991. He served as APA president in 1993. For the period of 2014-2016, Farley represents Division 32 (Society for Humanistic Psychology) on the APA Council of Representatives. He was elected president of the Society for the Study of Peace, Conflict and Violence for a term beginning in August 2015. A founding officer of the Federation of Associations in Behavioral and Brain Sciences, he has held several positions on the board of that organization.

Farley formulated the concept of the Type T (thrill-seeking) personality. He theorizes that Type T personalities require an increased level of stimulation to maintain their energy levels. In a 2011 Los Angeles Times opinion piece, Farley discussed infidelity among politicians, pointing out that the risk-taking behaviors that led to political success might also predispose to acts of sexual indiscretion. Farley writes a blog, "The People's Professor", for Psychology Today.

After the release of the fifth edition of the Diagnostic and Statistical Manual of Mental Disorders (DSM) in 2013, Farley characterized the system of psychiatric diagnosis as "beyond fixing" and said that it was "time to rethink the whole concept." He has specifically criticized the inclusion of somatic symptom disorder, saying, "Yes, the mind and body are intimately connected. But let's not create mental illnesses where hyper concern over serious physical health status is all that is going on."

On May 4, 2017, The Globe and Mail published an op-ed by Farley, a psychologist and L.H.Carnell Professor at Temple University, which used Marisa Lazo as an example of an individual with a Type T personality.  Lazo was an urban explorer, who had recently climbed a twelve-storey construction tower, and then shinnied down the cable to its hook, only to require emergency personnel to rescue her.  Farley went on to describe individuals whose thrill-seeking had a negative effect on society, and those whose thrill-seeking had a positive effect.

Awards and honors
Fellow, American Association for the Advancement of Science (AAAS)
Fellow, AERA
Fellow, Society for the Scientific Study of Sexuality
Alumni of Influence, University of Saskatchewan, 2014

Selected publications

Articles

Chapters
"The Type-T Personality", in Self-regulatory Behavior and Risk Taking: Causes and Consequences (1991).

References

Living people
People from Edmonton
Presidents of the American Psychological Association
Temple University faculty
University of Wisconsin–Madison faculty
University of Saskatchewan alumni
Alumni of the University of London
Humanistic psychologists
Year of birth missing (living people)